The 2004–05 season saw Peterborough United compete in Football League One where they finished in 23rd position with 39 points and were relegated to League Two.

Final league table

Results
Peterborough United's score comes first

Legend

Football League One

FA Cup

League Cup

Football League Trophy

References

Peterborough United F.C. seasons
Peterborough United